Switch is a British supernatural comedy-drama centring a quartet of witches  known as "The Witches of Camden" who try to make their way in London. Created by Touchpaper Television for ITV2, the show stars Lacey Turner, Nina Toussaint-White, Hannah Tointon and Phoebe Fox. Its six-episode run began on 15 October 2012 at 10pm.

Plot
Switch is an upbeat comedy drama about four young witches trying to make their way in the big city where they live in Camden, North London. They want to live a modern life, not one based on their mother's old-fashioned rituals. But modern life presents serious problems, and the girls cannot help casting the occasional spell to try to sort things out.

Cast
The main cast are made up of four fun loving flatmates in Camden, North London. Each of the witches represents an element that handily provides a summarisation of their character.

Main

Stella Munroe (Lacey Turner) is business savvy careerist, she's the mum of the bunch. Always immaculately dressed, Stella's the grown-up who goes out to work and pays all the bills, but her willingness to please can often see her getting into tricky situations. But despite the odd panic whenever things get out of control, it's Stella who's there to look after the other girls (and tidy the flat after them). Stella represents the element, Earth.
Jude Thomas (Nina Toussaint-White) is a 'bolshie' wannabe fashion designer and is the fiery one of the group. Jude is incredibly driven and when she sees something she wants she is going to get it, no matter the cost. With an eye for the boys and a finger on the pulse of the party scene, stylish and sexy Jude is never far away from having a good time. Jude represents the element, Fire.
Grace Watkins (Phoebe Fox) is the baby of the quartet, who is still adjusting to life in the Big City, but as the most traditional of the witches she should not be underestimated. With a strong moral sense of what is right and wrong, it is often down to Grace to pull the rest of the girls back from the brink when they are teetering on the edge of disaster. Grace represents the element, Water.
Hannah Bright (Hannah Tointon) is the traveller of the group, and her flighty nature has taken her all over the world. Although devoted to the girls wherever she is, Hannah is often just passing through without much thought to what she is doing. More than a bit restless and a massive fear of commitment, she just goes wherever the wind may take her. Hannah represents the element, Air.

Recurring
Lucy (Rosamund Hanson) is Stella's nightmare ex-girlfriend.
Gloria Watkins (Caroline Quentin) is Grace's mother.
Janet Boot (Amanda Drew) is Stella's boss.
Aaron (Reece Noi) is Jude's work pal.
Gerry (Jamie Davis) is Jude's boyfriend/Grace's love interest.
Alexa (Fiona Hampton) is the leader of Witches of Kensington.
India (Sophie Colquhoun) is the former water element member of the Witches of Kensington.
Remy (Katharine Bennett-Fox) is one of the Witches of Kensington.
Romola (Harriet Ballard) is one of the Witches of Kensington.

Star signs
On a card given by Stella to Hannah in the first episode, the girl's birthdays are as follows:

Grace – 1 February (Aquarius)
Stella – 23 April (Taurus)
Jude – 27 July (Leo)
Hannah – 26 September (Libra)

Episode list

Production
The six-part first series began filming in April 2012 for 11 weeks in London, Cardiff and Bristol, and concluded in July. It was announced on Lacey Turner's official Twitter support page 'Lacey Turner Fans' that it would not continue for a second series.

Reception

Critical reception
Louisa Mellor of Den of Geek wrote a mixed review; "Though it's frothier than Being Human and nowhere as near the knuckle as Misfits, it's original UK genre TV and as such, we welcome it with open arms." She also named Fox and Turner as the stand-outs of the series.

Ratings
The series premier which was watched by 574,000 viewers and 62,000 an hour later, performed well above the slot average of 440,000 (2.4%) for the past 12 months and was also the most-watched show on the channel across the day.

References

External links
 

2012 British television series debuts
ITV (TV network) original programming
Television shows set in London
Witchcraft in television
Television about magic
2012 British television series endings
British fantasy television series